Mike Hasselbach (born 29 June 1969) is a South African rower. He competed at the 1996 Summer Olympics and the 2000 Summer Olympics.

References

External links
 

1969 births
Living people
South African male rowers
Olympic rowers of South Africa
Rowers at the 1996 Summer Olympics
Rowers at the 2000 Summer Olympics
Place of birth missing (living people)
21st-century South African people